The Angel is a 1982 French experimental art film directed by Patrick Bokanowski. It was released on DVD for the first time in 2009, edited by the British Animation Awards. The film was shown at Fantasporto during February 1983 and shown to the general public in France on April 4, 1984.

Synopsis
The Angel does not have a narrative set in place; rather, there is a guideline governing its shifts and development. The masked silhouettes climb stairs, and engage in various meetings on each level, while being digitally manipulated in time. The film could be described as a spiritual quest that doubles as a study of optical illusions, Bokanowski recreating all the objectives of his cameras. This is a feature film, which is rare for artisanal animation and experimental films.

In the booklet that accompanies the DVD which contains Bokanowski's sole two documentaries (La Part du Hasard, 1984, on the painter Henri Dimier; and Le Rêve éveillé, 2003; dialogues between the psychotherapist Colette Béatrice Aboulker-Muscat and her patients), editor Pip Chodorov wrote: "The search for the overrunning of perception, and thereby oneself, is an expression of the spirituality present in the lives of these two figures: inspiration that we also found in Bokanowski's films, which are also searches into abstraction in the real, mysterious blanks that recover the daily. In his film The Angel, characters search for light, and rise in spirals towards beacons of white and pure light, the librarian-researchers conduct a fierce intellectual quest, hoping for an illuminating response buried under mountains of books. Light plays a central role for the filmmaker, just like it does for the painter and therapist, as a peak of dramatic pleasure. We are pulled forward, upward, through these leaks in the twilight towards the light."

Themes of ascension
Again according to Raphaël Bassan, The Angel can be seen as a spiritual ascension. Patrick Bokanowski creates his own universe and obeys his own aesthetic logic. It takes us through a series of distorted areas, obscure visions, metamorphoses, and synthetic objects. Indeed, in the film, the human may be viewed as a fetish object (for example, the doll hanging by a thread), with reference to Kafkaesque and Freudian theories on automata and the fear of man faced with something as complex as him. The ascent of the stairs would be the liberation of the ideas of death, culture, and sex that makes us reach the emblematic figure of the angel.

Themes of vision and sight
For Jacques Kermabon, The Angel is a variation of optics, as control and manipulation of light, as attested by the integration of plastic optical devices. Similarly, the effects on perspective diagrams emphasizes the relativity of this representation process. In the same gesture, the aesthetics of The Angel, which opens up an infinity of possibilities, announces a cinema that would be before any movement, rhythm, rhyme, form, or work on the color and material: a cinema where the meaning is dissolved and effect predominates. In a way, Patrick Bokanowski brilliantly realized what some artists-filmmakers envisioned in the 1920s: an aesthetic for creations to come – the Cinéma pur and the first avant-garde.

Soundtrack
A CD album containing the soundtrack accompanying the film, composed by Michèle Bokanowski, the director's wife, was released during 2003 by the label trAace under the title L'Ange.

Technical information
Title: The Angel
Country: France
Release Date: 25 May 1982
Format: Color
Duration: 64 Minutes
Shooting: 1977–1982
Directing, Editing, Special Effects, and Cinematography: Patrick Bokanowski
Music and Sound Editing: Michèle Bokanowski
Cameraman: Philippe Lavalette
Sets and Models: Christian Daninos and Patrick Bokanowski
Masks: Christian Daninos
Costumes: Domenika
Production: Kira B.M. Films
Distribution: Forum Distribution

Cast
First Librarian: Maurice Baquet
Bathing Man: Jean-Marie Bon
Servant: Martine Couture
Swordsman/Handless Man: Jacques Faure
Librarian/Apprentice: Mario Gonzales
Librarian/Artist: René Patrignani
Naked Woman: Rita Renoir
Sewing Woman: Patricia Peretti
Librarian: Alain Salomon
Librarian: Dominique Serrand
Librarian: Nicolas Serreau
Librarian: Max Guy Cravagnac
Librarian: Abby Patrix

Report on the animation
According to Raphaël Bassan, in his article «L'Ange: Un météore dans le ciel de l'animation,» Patrick Bokanowski's film, along with Piotr Kamler's film Chronopolis, both having premiered in 1982 at the Cannes Film Festival, can be considered the beginnings of contemporary animation. This remark is based on the technical means and the visual or philosophical sense employed by Patrick Bokanowski. The masks erase all human personality in the characters. Patrick Bokanowski would thus have total control over the "matter" of the image and its optical composition. This is especially noticeable throughout the film, with images taken through distorted objectives or a plastic work on the sets and costumes, for example in the scene of the designer.

See also
 List of films about angels

References

Bibliography 
Raphaël Bassan, «Bokanowski/Kamler: Deux avant-gardes graphiques,» Canal, n° 49, juillet–septembre 1982. 
Raphaël Bassan, «L'Ange: Un météore dans le ciel de l'animation,» La Revue du cinéma, n° 393, avril 1984. 
Youssef Ishaghpour, «Bokanowski: L'Ange,» Cinéma contemporain: De ce côté du miroir, Paris, Éditions de la Différence, 1986, p. 318–331. 
Patrick Bokanowski, «L'Ange,» Noise n° 12, Paris, Maeght Éditeur, 1990. 
Jacques Kermabon, «Portrait Patrick Bokanowski,» Bref, le magazine du court métrage, n° 20, février–mars–avril 1994, p. 17–19. 
Scott MacDonald, "Patrick Bokanowski on The Angel," A Critical Cinema: Interviews with Independent Filmmakers 3, Oakland, University of California Press, 1998, pp. 262–273.
Dominique Noguez, Éloge du cinéma expérimental, Classiques de l'Avant-garde, Paris, Éditions Paris Expérimental, 2ème édition, 1999.

External links

The Angel at The New York Times Movies
The Angel at the TCM Movie Database

1980s avant-garde and experimental films
1980s business films
1982 independent films
1982 films
Films about angels
Films about death
Films about disability
Films about education
Films about sexuality
Films about spirituality
Films about the arts
Films directed by Patrick Bokanowski
Films set in France
Films shot in France
French avant-garde and experimental films
French drama films
French independent films
French silent feature films
Non-narrative films
Silent films in color
1980s psychological drama films
1982 directorial debut films
1982 drama films
Silent drama films
Silent horror films
1980s French films